Otradnoye District  is an administrative district (raion) of North-Eastern Administrative Okrug, and one of the 125 raions of Moscow, Russia.

Education
22 comprehensive secondary schools are located in this district, including School No. 263.

See also
Administrative divisions of Moscow

References

Notes

Districts of Moscow
North-Eastern Administrative Okrug